Mike Bredenkamp (2 May 1873 – 22 December 1940) was a South African international rugby union player who played as a forward.

He made 2 appearances for South Africa against the British Lions in 1896.

References

South African rugby union players
South Africa international rugby union players
1873 births
1940 deaths
Rugby union forwards
Griquas (rugby union) players